The following is a list of notable events and releases of the year 1982 in Norwegian music.

Events

April
 2 – The 9th Vossajazz started in Voss, Norway (April 2 – 4).

May
 26 – 10th Nattjazz started in Bergen, Norway (May 26 – June 9).

June
 27 – The 13th Kalvøyafestivalen started at Kalvøya near by Oslo.

Albums released

Unknown date

A
 Arild Andersen
 Lifelines (ECM Records)

G
 Jan Garbarek
 Paths, Prints (ECM Records), with Bill Frisell, Eberhard Weber, and Jon Christensen
 Trip to Prillarguri (Soul Note Records), with George Russell Sextet
 Haakon Graf
 Hideaway (Strawberry Records) with Jon Christensen and Sveinung Hovensjø

K
 Karin Krog
 Two Of A Kind (Four Leaf Records) with Bengt Hallberg
 Bjørn Kruse / Olav Berg / Nils Henrik Asheim / Kjell Samkopf
 Contemporary Music From Norway (Four Leaf Records) with The Norwegian Contemporary Music Ensemble

N
 Lillebjørn Nilsen
 Original Nilsen (Studio B Records)

R
 Inger Lise Rypdal
 Kontakt (Talent Records)

T
 Radka Toneff
 Fairytales (Odin Records) with Steve Dobrogosz

Deaths

October
 21 – Radka Toneff, jazz singer (born 1952).

 November
 27 – Jonas Brunvoll, Jr., operatic singer and actor (born 1920).

Births

January
 1 – Andreas Lønmo Knudsrød, jazz drummer.
 19 – Maria Solheim, singer and songwriter.

February
 4 – Hedvig Mollestad Thomassen, jazz guitarist, vocalist, and composer.
 12 – Øyvind Hegg-Lunde, jazz drummer and percussionist.
 13 – Even Helte Hermansen, jazz guitarist

March
 8 – Isak Strand, drummer and electronica artist, Me At Sea.
 9 – Gunnar Greve, talent manager, A&R, producer, songwriter, record executive nad vocalist.
 27 – Admiral P, singer, songwriter, and reggae artist.

April
 2 – Daniel Herskedal, jazz tubist and composer.
 9 – Øyvind Skarbø, drummer and composer.
 21 – Ørjan Hartveit, classical baritone singer.

June
 14 – Anders Jektvik, singer, songwriter and guitarist.
 28 – Simen Aanerud, musician and inventor.

July
 6 – Petter Vågan, guitarist, singer, and composer.
 27 – Kristin Minde, pop singer and pianist.

August
 7 – Anders Hana, jazz guitarist and composer.

September
 5 – Sondre Lerche, singer, songwriter and multi-instrumentalist.

November
 6 – Torbjørn Schei, black metal singer and songwriter.
 24 – Therese Birkelund Ulvo, contemporary composer and music producer.
 29 – Marthe Valle, singer and songwriter.

December
 17 – Stephan Meidell, guitarist and composer.

Unknown date
 Håvard Lothe, vocalist and guitarist.

See also
 1982 in Norway
 Music of Norway
 Norway in the Eurovision Song Contest 1982

References

 
Norwegian music
Norwegian
Music
1980s in Norwegian music